Football Club Bagnols-sur-Cèze – Pont-Saint-Esprit (Occitan Banhòus de Céser – Lo Pònt Sant Esperit; commonly referred to as FC Bagnols Pont or simply Bagnols Pont) is a French football club based in Bagnols-sur-Cèze in the Occitanie region. The club was founded on 21 July 2000 following the merger of two local clubs; Union Club Bagnols Jeunesse and Indépendante de Pont-Saint-Esprit. Bagnols Pont currently plays in the Championnat National 3, the fifth division of French football, after achieving promotion in the 2021–22 season.

References

External links
 Official site

Association football clubs established in 2000
2000 establishments in France
Sport in Gard
Football clubs in Occitania (administrative region)